James Sloan Baumer (January 29, 1931 – July 8, 1996) was an American professional baseball player, scout, and front office executive. A right-handed-hitting infielder born in Tulsa, Oklahoma, Baumer was a graduate of Broken Arrow Senior High.

Baumer had a highly unusual Major League playing career. A power-hitting shortstop, he was signed by the Chicago White Sox for $50,000 as a "bonus baby" at the age of 18 in 1949, days before the New York Yankees signed fellow Oklahoma prospect Mickey Mantle for $1,500. The bonus rule at the time forced Baumer to start his career in the major leagues with Chicago, where he hit .400 (four hits in 10 at bats in 1949, including a double and a triple). He then disappeared into the minor leagues for the decade of the 1950s, and did not return to MLB until, as a 30-year-old, he had a brief trial with the  Cincinnati Reds. Baumer appeared in ten of Cincinnati's first 13 games, eight as the Reds' starting second baseman, but collected only three singles and batted .125.  The day of his last MLB game, April 27, 1961, the Reds acquired second baseman Don Blasingame in a trade with the San Francisco Giants.  Baumer was traded to the Detroit Tigers for first baseman Dick Gernert on May 10, and returned to the minor leagues. Overall, Baumer batted .206 in 18 MLB games and 34 at bats, with two runs batted in. After his big league career, Baumer played for the Nishitetsu Lions in Japan from  until .

The following season, he succeeded Jim Wilson as the Brewers' general manager. Baumer's most successful transaction during his three-year tenure as GM was his acquisition of first baseman Cecil Cooper from the Boston Red Sox following the  season.

He then joined the Philadelphia Phillies as a scout, and was promoted to director of the Phils' scouting and farm system operations in 1981. Two laters later, Baumer was named a team vice president.

Baumer died at age 65 in the Philadelphia suburb of Paoli, Pennsylvania.

References

External links

1931 births
1996 deaths
American expatriate baseball players in Japan
American expatriate baseball players in Mexico
Atlanta Crackers players
Baseball players from Oklahoma
Chicago White Sox players
Cincinnati Reds players
Colorado Springs Sky Sox (WL) players
Columbus Jets players
Denver Bears players
Hollywood Stars players
Houston Astros scouts
Major League Baseball farm directors
Major League Baseball general managers
Major League Baseball scouting directors
Major League Baseball second basemen
Major League Baseball shortstops
Memphis Chickasaws players
Milwaukee Brewers executives
Milwaukee Brewers scouts
Nippon Professional Baseball first basemen
Nippon Professional Baseball second basemen
Nippon Professional Baseball third basemen
Nishitetsu Lions players
Philadelphia Phillies executives
Philadelphia Phillies scouts
Salt Lake City Bees players
Sportspeople from Tulsa, Oklahoma
Tigres del México players
Waterloo White Hawks players